Irvine M. Levine first discovered Levine-Critchley syndrome in 1960.  He is an American physician and described his findings in Neurology in 1964 and again in 1968. He was chief of neurological research at the VA Hospital of Boston.

References

Levine, I.M. "A Hereditary Neurological Disease with Acanthocytosis." Neurology. Cleveland, Ohio, 1964, 16: 272.

Possibly living people
Year of birth missing
American physicians